Carlos Moyá Llompart (born 27 August 1976) is a Spanish former world No. 1 tennis player. He was the French Open singles champion in 1998 and was the singles runner-up at the 1997 Australian Open. In 2004, he was part of his country's winning Davis Cup team. He has been Rafael Nadal's primary coach since 2016.

Tennis career
In November 1995, at the age of 19, Moyá won his first tournament at the top-level in Buenos Aires, defeating Félix Mantilla in the final. In May 1996, Moyá defeated the clay-court champion Thomas Muster, in the semifinals of the tournament in Munich, ending Muster's streak of winning 38 matches in a row on clay-courts. It was the fourth time in four weeks that Moyá had played a match against Muster. In the final of Munich, Sláva Doseděl defeated Moyá.

In 1997, Moyá reached his first Grand Slam final at the Australian Open, defeating defending champion Boris Becker in the first round of the tournament, Jonas Björkman in the fourth round, and world No. 3 Michael Chang in the semifinals, in straight sets, before losing in straight sets to Pete Sampras. Before the US Open, he won brilliantly in Long Island. His opponent in the final was the future winner of US Open a few days later, the Australian Patrick Rafter. Moyá lost due to an injury in the first round of the US Open.

In 1998, Moyá won the French Open. He defeated Sébastien Grosjean, Pepe Imaz, Andrew Ilie and Jens Knippschild before beating the tournament favourite, Marcelo Ríos in the quarterfinal. He then defeated Félix Mantilla Botella in the semifinal and fellow-Spaniard Álex Corretja in the final with a straight-sets win. He also won his first Tennis Masters Series tournament that year at Monte Carlo. He reached the semifinals of the US Open, losing to Mark Philippoussis. He concluded the year by finishing runner-up at the ATP World Championships (now known as the ATP World Tour Finals), where he lost in a five-set final to Corretja, having won the first two sets.

In March 1999, after finishing runner-up at Indian Wells, Moyá reached the world No. 1 singles ranking, the first Spanish player in history to achieve this feat. He held the top spot for two weeks. Later that year, he entered the French Open as defending champion and lost in the fourth round to eventual winner Andre Agassi. At the US Open, Moyá withdrew in the second round with a back injury and only played in two tournaments for the rest of the year.

Despite being hampered with a stress fracture in his lower back from the 1999 US Open through the early part of 2000, Moyá still finished in the top 50 in the world for the fifth straight year. He reached the fourth round of the US Open, where he held a match point in the fourth set, but eventually lost to Todd Martin in five sets, 7–6, 7–6, 1–6, 6–7, 2–6. Moyá's best result for the rest of 2000 was winning at the Portugal Open final over his countryman Francisco Clavet.

In 2001, Moyá won the title at Umag. He also finished runner-up at Barcelona, where he lost in a four-hour marathon final to countryman Juan Carlos Ferrero.

2002 saw Moyá win four titles from six finals. He captured his second career Tennis Masters Series title, and the biggest hard-court title of his career, at Cincinnati, where he defeated world No. 1, Lleyton Hewitt, in the final.

Moyá captured three clay-court titles in 2003. He also helped Spain reach the final of the Davis Cup, compiling a 6–0 singles record. In the semifinals, he won the deciding rubber against Gastón Gaudio as Spain beat Argentina, 3–2. He beat Mark Philippoussis on grass in the final. But that proved to be Spain's only point, as they lost the final 1–4 to Australia.

In 2004, Moyá helped Spain go one better and win the Davis Cup. In the final, he won two critical singles rubbers against Andy Roddick and Mardy Fish, as Spain beat the United States 3–2. The year also saw Moyà capture his third career Masters Series title at Rome, where he defeated David Nalbandian in the final. He was the only player on the tour to win at least 20 matches on both clay courts and hardcourts that year.

In July 2004, Moyá's kind-hearted gesture to hit with ball boy Sandeep Ponniah at the 2004 Tennis Masters Series Toronto event captured audiences during an injury timeout against opponent Nicolas Kiefer of Germany. To the crowd's surprise, Ponniah shuffled Moyá across the baseline and received an ovation for an overhead smash on a Moyá lob.

Moyá won his 18th career title in January 2005 at Chennai. He donated his prize money for the win to the 2004 Indian Ocean Earthquake and Tsunami victims.

In January 2007, Moyá was the runner-up at the Sydney International, losing to defending champion James Blake.

In May 2007, at the Hamburg Masters, he defeated Mardy Fish, world No. 12 Tomáš Berdych, world No. 9 Blake, and world No. 6 Novak Djokovic, a run which saw him reach his first Masters semifinal since 2004 Indian Wells, where he lost to Roger Federer.

Moyá lost against Rafael Nadal in straight sets in the quarterfinals of the 2007 French Open.

During Wimbledon, Moyá lost in the first round to Tim Henman in a five-set thriller, the fifth set stretching to 24 games (Henman won 13–11). Despite the loss, Moyá had no points to defend (he had not played a grass-court match in a few years), resulting in his moving to world No. 20, his first time inside the top 20 since 13 June 2005.

In July 2007, Moyá won the Croatia Open in Umag, defeating Andrei Pavel. The win brought him to world No. 18 in the rankings, his highest rank since 23 May 2005, when he was world No. 15.  In 2007 at Cincinnati, he reached the quarter-finals, where he lost to Lleyton Hewitt.

In 2008 at the Cincinnati Masters, Moyá defeated Nikolay Davydenko, the match being played over the course of two days because of rain. Hours after his match with Davydenko, Moyá beat Igor Andreev.

Moyá made a slow start in 2009. He failed to progress beyond the second round of his first four tournaments, including a first-round loss at the Australian Open. In March 2009, he announced that he would have an indefinite hiatus from tennis to recover from injured tendons and ischium in his hip. He returned to professional tennis in January 2010, losing against Janko Tipsarević in the first round of the Chennai Open, then losing in the first round of the 2010 Australian Open to Illya Marchenko.

On 17 November 2010, he announced his retirement from tennis owing to a long-standing foot injury from which he failed to recover. He received a special ceremony at the O2 Arena in London during the 2010 ATP World Tour Finals, with all top eight singles and doubles players attending. Other players who attended included Fernando Verdasco, Mikhail Youzhny, Àlex Corretja, Jonas Björkman, and Thomas Johansson.

He has won ATP Tour singles titles in eleven countries: Argentina, Croatia, France, Italy, India, Mexico, Monaco, Portugal, Spain, Sweden, and the United States.

Major finals

Grand Slam finals

Singles: 2 (1–1)

Masters Series finals

Singles: 6 (3–3)

ATP career finals

Singles: 44 (20 titles, 24 runner-ups)

Team
2004 – Davis Cup winner with Spain

Singles performance timeline

Top 10 wins
He has a  record against players who were, at the time the match was played, ranked in the top 10.

Personal life
In July 2011, Moyá married actress Carolina Cerezuela. They have two daughters and a son.

See also

List of Grand Slam men's singles champions

References

External links
Carlos Moya on Twitter 
 
 
 
 bio – file interview with Carlos Moya
 Moya Recent Match Results
 Moya World Ranking History

1976 births
Tennis players from the Balearic Islands
Spanish expatriate sportspeople in Switzerland
Hopman Cup competitors
Living people
Sportspeople from Palma de Mallorca
Spanish male tennis players
Olympic tennis players of Spain
Tennis players at the 2004 Summer Olympics
French Open champions
Grand Slam (tennis) champions in men's singles
Spanish tennis coaches
Masters tennis players
ATP number 1 ranked singles tennis players